The Evangelische Pfarrkirche in Großwinternheim, part of Ingelheim am Rhein, also called Selztaldom meaning Selz valley cathedral, is a romanesque revival aisleless church built according to Romanesque architecture blueprints from the Middle Rhine. The building is protected by cultural heritage management.

History 
The church was erected in 1888 according to the drawings of Heinrich von Schmidt (Munic) on the cemetery, still in use. The building time was two years. She replaced the old church in the village center, being now the fire brigades home.

Architecture

Exterior 
The church is built as hall church in southward direction with a short nave and crossing as well as a diminished apse.

Literature 

Dieter Krienke, Kreis Mainz-Bingen. Städte Bingen und Ingelheim, Gemeinde Budenheim, Verbandsgemeinden Gau-Algesheim, Heidesheim, Rhein-Nahe und Sprendlingen-Gensingen (= Kulturdenkmäler in Rheinland-Pfalz. Denkmaltopographie Bundesrepublik Deutschland. Band 18.1). Wernersche Verlagsgesellschaft, Worms 2007, .
 Georg Dehio, Rheinland-Pfalz / Saarland, Deutscher Kunstverlag, 1972, p. 275

References 

Buildings and structures in Mainz-Bingen
Ingelheim
Romanesque Revival church buildings in Germany
1880s architecture